Michael Bernard Kersting (born December 10, 1965), also known as Grant Michael B., Michael B. and Grand Ma B., is a German record producer, publisher and composer. He has produced artists and bands like Der Wolf, Young Deenay, Sasha, Ben and Max Mutzke.

Life and career

A short time after his high school exams in 1986, Kersting set up his first professional recording studio, 'Click', in the town of Werl, North Rhine Westphalia. At the same time he created Click Publishing, subsuming the two businesses under the name "Clickmusic". He enrolled at the University of Münster to study politics and history while founding his first band, Private Property. In 1989, Kersting signed a record deal with Warner Music in Hamburg. Along with producer Pete Smith he released his first single, "Waiting for the Morning Sun". Due to the lack of commercial success, Kersting subsequently decided to work as a record producer only.

Producing, composing, publishing 

In 1993, Kersting managed to enter the German Single Charts, producing the song "Declaration (DipDipDa)" for the group Sir Prize. In the 1990s, he continued to gain critical acclaim and commercial success as a producer, composer, and publisher, working with artists such as Double Impact, German rapper Der Wolf, hip hop artist Young Deenay, Q Connection, and Sasha. After signing with Clickmusic in 1991, German singer-songwriter Sasha achieved his international breakthrough with the single release "If you believe" in 1998. with Kersting and Pomez di Lorenzo writing and producing the song.

Kersting gained further success with German rockabilly band Dick Brave and the Backbeats in 2003. In co-operation with Offenbach-based record producer Oliver Rüger, he produced German artists like Max Mutzke, Wilson Gonzalez Ochsenknecht, and Rafael Weber from 2005 to 2010. In 2010, Kersting signed German ska punk band Sondaschule. In 2011, he contracted Leipzig-based band Flimmerfrühstück and produced their 2011 record In Allen meinen Liedern, along with Swen Meyer. In October 2011, Kersting released the second Dick Brave and the Backbeats album Rock'n'Roll Therapy, which gained gold record status. In the summer of 2013, he signed Leipzig-based artist LOT. He gained further success for the production of the 2015 album Schön kaputt by Sondaschule.

List of albums and singles as producer, composer and publisher 
With Sasha

Albums
 1998 – Dedicated to …
 2000 – … You
 2001 – Surfin' on a Backbeat
 2004 – Dick This (as Dick Brave and the Backbeats)
 2006 – Open Water
 2006 – Greates Hits
 2009 – Good News on a Bad Day
 2011 – Rock'n'Roll Therapy (as Dick Brave and the Backbeats)
 2014 – The One

Singles

 1998 – I'm Still Waitin' with Young Deenay
 1998 – If You Believe
 1999 – I Feel Lonely
 2000 – Let Me Be the One
 2001 – Here She Comes Again
 2002 – This is My Time
 2004 – Take Good Care of My Baby (as Dick Brave and the Backbeats)
 2006 – Coming Home
 2007 – Lucky Day
 2009 – Father and Son (with Michael "Bully" Herbig)
 2011 – Just can't Get Enough
 2012 – Just the Way You Are
 2015 – Good Days

with Young Deenay

Alben

 1998 – Birth

Singles

 1997 – Walk on By
 1998 – Wannabe Your Lover
 1998 – I'm Still Waitin' (with Sasha)
 1998 – I Want 2 Be Your Man
 1999 – You and Me (Stay Alive)

with Der Wolf

Alben
 1997 – Das Album
 1998 – Musik aus (m)einem Jahrzehnt
 2000 – Was soll ich sagen …

Singles

 1996 – Gibt's doch gar nicht
 1997 – Frau aus Seide
 1997 – Oh Shit, Frau Schmidt
 1998 – Dumm gelaufen
 1998 – Kein' Kuchen da! (Hätt' ich dich heut' erwartet …)

with Ben

Alben
 2002 – Hörproben
 2003 – Leben leben

Singles

 2002 – Engel
 2002 – Herz aus Glaß
 2002 – Gesegnet seist du
 2003 – Kleider machen Leute
 2003 – Verliebt

Various artists
 1993: Sir Prize – Declaration (DipDipDa)
 1994: Ernestine – Keep on Dancin' (Thru the Nite)
 1995: Ernestine – Do You Really Want My Love
 1995: Sir Prize – Lullaby of Love
 1995: Synthax feat. Ayla – Need Your Lovin
 1996: Sir Prize – Love is the Answer
 1996: H.I.M. – Lookin' Out 4 Luv
 1997: Hobo feat. Jill – Star
 1997: Hobo feat. Muddy Waters – Hoochie Coochie Man
 1997: Sir Prize – Don't Go Away
 1999: Q Connection – Java (All Da Ladies Come Around)
 1999: Q Connection – Where I'm From
 1999: Q Connection – Bei mir bist du schön
 2001: Thomas Gottschalk – What Happened to Rock'n'Roll (single)
 2001: Jack Radics – Always Around (album)
 2001: Uwe Ochsenknecht – Singer
 2003: Become One – Don't Need Your Alibis
 2004: Boppin'B – Bop Around the Pop (album)
 2004: Boppin'B – If You Believe (single)
 2004: Jelena Jakopin – True
 2008: Max Mutzke – Black Forrest (album)
 2008: Wilson Gonzalez Ochsenknecht – NYC
 2008: Wilson Gonzalez Ochsenknecht – I'm Fallin'
 2008: Wilson Gonzalez Ochsenknecht – Cookies (album)
 2009: Max Mutzke – Marie (single)
 2010: Sondaschule – Von A nach B (album)
 2011: Flimmerfrühstück – In allen meinen Liedern (album)
 2012: Sondaschule – Lass es uns tun (album)
 2014: LOT – Warum soll sich das ändern (EP)
 2015: Sondaschule – Wunderschön kaputt (album)
 2015: LOT – 200 Tage (album)

Film score
 2001: Wilsberg: Wilsberg und der Mord ohne Leiche
 2002: The Rules of Attraction

References

Links 
 Website Michael Kersting
recorded musicmusikmarkt.de
 Official German Music Charts www.gfk-entertainment.com/
 Discography of Michael Kersting
 Pofil: Click music at mediabiz.de, musikwoche.de at April 29, 2009

1965 births
Living people
German record producers
German music managers